Shooting competitions at the 2016 Summer Olympics in Rio de Janeiro took place from 6 to 14 August at the National Shooting Center in Deodoro. A maximum of 390 athletes were able to compete in the fifteen events across these Games. The event format was similar to 2012, although there were significant changes to the rules and guidelines of the competition.

Format changes
On 23 November 2012, the International Shooting Sport Federation instituted new rules to the competition format designed to enhance the sport's appeal to youth, to make it more spectator and media friendly, and to keep the competitions fair and transparent. The most significant change to the rules was the new final format for all Olympic events, where all finalists must start from scratch. Furthermore, all finals featured an elimination stage, until the competition ended up with duels between the two shooters to decide the gold and silver medals. Other ratified changes included decimal scoring for both air rifle and rifle prone, separate sighting and match firing periods, limited use of performance-enhancing rifle clothing and equipment, target throwing distance in skeet shooting, and adjustment of targets in the double trap.

Qualification

The qualification system was similar to that used for previous Games, with a fixed number of quota places divided among the nations whose shooters place well at top-level global and continental championships. As per the guidelines from the International Shooting Sport Federation, qualification commenced with the 2014 ISSF World Shooting Championships in Granada, Spain, which concluded on 19 September 2014, two years before the Olympics. Throughout the process, quota places were generally awarded when a shooter earns a gold medal in an ISSF World Cup series or posts a top finish at the ISSF World Championships or the continental championships (Africa, Europe, Asia, Oceania, and the Americas).

Brazil did not qualify through the World Championships, rather its nine places were guaranteed due to it being the host nation.

Schedule

Participation

Participating nations

Competitors

Medal summary

Medal table

Men's events

Women's events

See also
Shooting at the 2016 Summer Paralympics

References

External links 

 
 
 Results Book – Shooting

 
2016
2016 Summer Olympics events
Olympics
Shooting competitions in Brazil